Sunset Zoo, also known as Sunset Zoological Park, is the city zoo of Manhattan, Kansas and houses to over 300 animals representing more than 100 species.

History 
In 1929, the city of Manhattan purchased a land called Sunset Cemetery. A part of the land was not used to bury people because of rocky soil. This area was converted into the Sunset Zoo by the government. Until 1934, the zoo was not chartered as a park, but there were animals at the zoo as since 1930. The zoo was officially founded in 1933.

Dr. E.J. Frick, founder of the zoo and a former Head of Surgery and Medicine at the Kansas State University School of Veterinary Medicine, volunteered to acquire, provide care for, and display animals for 43 years. The city received its original funding from the Works Progress Administration (WPA) for the initial construction of animal exhibits, buildings and walkways. Much of this original native limestone work has been preserved, serving as educational examples of social history, and remains part of the zoo's Master Plan.

In 1980, the citizens of Manhattan encouraged the City Commission to build a modern zoo. This led to the development of a Zoo Master Plan and city approval to charge a small admission fee. The revenue generated from admissions is used for new construction, renovations, improvements, and maintenance. Sunset Zoo applied for and received, accreditation by the American Zoo and Aquarium Association (AZA) in 1989.

Animals and exhibits

African Trail
Eastern black-and-white colobus
Chimpanzee
Violet turaco
Cheetah
Spotted hyena

Australian Walk-About
Emu
Black swan
Cattle egret
Chestnut teal
Laughing kookaburra
Silver gull
Straw-necked ibis
Parma wallaby
Red-necked wallaby

Kansas Plains
Raccoon
Swift fox
Bald eagle
Bobcat
American kestrel
Turkey vulture
Black-tailed prairie dog

Trails of South America
Maned wolf
Giant anteater
American flamingo
Chacoan peccary
American white pelican
Canada goose
Crested screamer
Indian peafowl
Ruddy duck
White-faced whistling duck
Red-eared slider
Red-footed tortoise
Cuvier's dwarf caiman
Reed titi monkey
Geoffrey's marmoset
Green and black poison dart frog
Yellow and blue poison dart frog
Llama
Nigerian Dwarf goat
Pot-bellied pig

Expedition Asia
Malayan tiger
Sloth bear
Red-crowned crane
Western tufted deer
Amur leopard
Cinereous vulture
Chukar partridge
Golden pheasant
Asian small-clawed otter
Red panda
Lar gibbon

Notes

References
Manhattan Mercury Article

External links

Friends of Sunset Zoo

Zoos in Kansas
Works Progress Administration in Kansas
Buildings and structures in Riley County, Kansas
Tourist attractions in Riley County, Kansas
Zoos established in 1933
Manhattan, Kansas